Edmond "Eddie" Dunphy (6 October 1897 – 9 November 1977) was an Irish hurler who played as a centre-forward for the Kilkenny senior team.

Born in Mooncoin, County Kilkenny, Dunphy first arrived on the inter-county scene at the age of twenty-two when he first linked up with the Kilkenny senior team. He made his senior debut during the 1922 championship. Dunphy immediately became a regular member of the starting fifteen, and won one All-Ireland medal and four Leinster medals. He was an All-Ireland runner-up on one occasion.

At club level he was a three-time championship medallist with Mooncoin.

Dunphy's brothers, Joe, William and Wattie, as well as his sons, Dick and Joe Dunphy, Jnr, all played for Kilkenny at different stages.

He retired from inter-county hurling following the conclusion of the 1929 championship.

Honours

Player

Mooncoin
Kilkenny Senior Hurling Championship (1): 1928, 1929, 1932

Kilkenny
All-Ireland Senior Hurling Championship (1): 1922
Leinster Senior Hurling Championship (4): 1922, 1923, 1925, 1926

References

1897 births
1977 deaths
Mooncoin hurlers
Kilkenny inter-county hurlers
All-Ireland Senior Hurling Championship winners